Richard Juel (died 1410) was the member of the Parliament of England for Salisbury for the parliaments of September 1397 and October 1404.

References 

Members of Parliament for Salisbury
English MPs September 1397
English MPs October 1404
Year of birth unknown
1410 deaths
Verderers
British coroners